Plantains (Plantago species) are used as food plants by the caterpillars of a number of Lepidoptera (butterflies and moths). These include:

 Arctiidae
 Hypercompe cermelii
 Hypercompe scribonia (giant leopard moth)
 Spilosoma luteum (buff ermine)
 Crambidae
 Diasemia reticularis
 Dolicharthria punctalis
 Geometridae
 Idaea biselata (small fan-footed wave)
 Lycaenidae
 Candalides heathi (rayed blue)
 Lymantriidae
 Euproctis chrysorrhoea (brown-tail)
 Noctuidae
 Agrotis exclamationis (heart and dart)
 Amphipyra tragopoginis (mouse moth)
 Mamestra brassicae (cabbage moth)
 Naenia typica (gothic)
 Noctua comes (lesser yellow underwing)
 Noctua pronuba (large yellow underwing)
 Ochropleura plecta (flame shoulder)
 Xestia c-nigrum (setaceous Hebrew character)
 Xestia sexstrigata (six-striped rustic)
 Nymphalidae
 Junonia coenia (common buckeye)
 Junonia villida (meadow argus)
 Melitaea athalia (heath fritillary) – recorded on ribwort plantain (P. lanceolata), greater plantain (P. major), alpine plantain (P. alpina) and possibly others
 Melitaea aurelia (Nickerl's fritillary) – recorded on ribwort plantain (P. lanceolata)
 Melitaea cinxia (Glanville fritillary)
 Melitaea didyma (spotted fritillary) – recorded on ribwort plantain (P. lanceolata)
 Melitaea parthenoides (European meadow fritillary) – recorded on ribwort plantain (P. lanceolata) and others

External links

Plantago
+Lepidoptera